The Governor of Aurora is the local chief executive of the province of Aurora, Philippines since 1979. Before being an independent province, Aurora was a sub-province of Quezon headed by the lieutenant governor from 1951–1978.

List of governors of Aurora

Lieutenant governors of Aurora (1951–1978)

Governors of Aurora (1979–present)

References

Governors of Aurora (province)
Aurora